The Star Lite Motel is a historic motel in Dilworth, Minnesota. It is one of the oldest buildings in Dilworth, and the oldest motel in Clay County. Earlier it was known as Charley's Motel. A previous owner created the neon sign that is regarded as the motel's most noteworthy feature.

Architecture 

The motel is blue, L-shaped, and in a specific 1950s motel architecture style, with a red neon sign on the end of the building by the road. The sign's architectural style was recognized as historic by numerous 1950s motel historians and passersby. The motel is a single-story edifice surrounded by a large parking lot and empty fields.

History 
Vivian Tang bought the Star Lite (formerly Charley's Motel) building in 1959 and operated it until the current owner, William Donovan, bought it.

See also 

 List of motels

References

External links 
 Official website

External links 
 Motel at Trip Advisor
 Motel at Wikimapia
 Motel at Places of America

Motels in the United States
1950s architecture in the United States
Fargo–Moorhead
Hotels in Minnesota
Buildings and structures in Clay County, Minnesota